Cenophengus debilis is a species in the family Phengodidae ("glowworm beetles"), in the order Coleoptera ("beetles").
It is found in North America.

References

Further reading
 Arnett, R.H. Jr., M. C. Thomas, P. E. Skelley and J. H. Frank. (eds.). (2002). American Beetles, Volume II: Polyphaga: Scarabaeoidea through Curculionoidea. CRC Press LLC, Boca Raton, FL.
 Richard E. White. (1983). Peterson Field Guides: Beetles. Houghton Mifflin Company.
 Ross H. Arnett. (2000). American Insects: A Handbook of the Insects of America North of Mexico. CRC Press.
 Zaragoza Caballero, Santiago (1984). "Catálogo de la familia Phengodidae (Coleóptera)". Anales del Instituto de Biología, Universidad Nacional Autónoma de Mexico, Serie Zoología, vol. 55, no. 1, 307–324.

External links
NCBI Taxonomy Browser, Cenophengus debilis

Phengodidae
Bioluminescent insects
Beetles described in 1881